, provisional designation , is a dark asteroid and synchronous binary system, classified as near-Earth object and potentially hazardous asteroid of the Amor group, approximately 3 kilometers in diameter. It was discovered on 19 August 1998, by astronomers of the LINEAR program at Lincoln Laboratory's Experimental Test Site near Socorro, New Mexico, in the United States. Its sub-kilometer minor-planet moon was discovered by radar on 30 May 2013.

Classification and orbital characteristics 

The asteroid orbits the Sun at a distance of 1.0–3.8 AU once every 3 years and 9 months (1,378 days; semi-major axis of 2.42 AU). Its orbit has an eccentricity of 0.57 and an inclination of 13° with respect to the ecliptic. As with many members of the Amor group, this asteroid has an aphelion beyond the orbit of Mars (at 1.66 AU) which also makes it a Mars-crosser.

The sooty surface of  suggested that it might have previously been a comet that experienced a close encounter with the Sun. However, the Tisserand parameter with respect to Jupiter (TJ=3.2) does not make it obvious whether  was ever a comet, since cometary TJ values are typically below 3.

Earth approach 

On 31 May 2013,  approached within  (15 lunar distances) of Earth at 20:59 UT (4:59 pm EDT). This was the closest approach the asteroid will make to Earth for at least the next two centuries. It is a very strong radar target for Goldstone from May 30 to June 9 and will be one for Arecibo from June 6 to June 12. At its closest approach the asteroid had an apparent magnitude of 11 and therefore required a small telescope to be seen.

Integrating the orbital solution shows the asteroid passed  from Earth on 8 June 1975 with an apparent magnitude of about 13.9.

Satellite 

Goldstone radar observations on 29 May 2013 discovered that  is orbited by a minor-planet moon approximately 600–800 meters in diameter. In radar images, the satellite appears brighter than  because it is rotating significantly more slowly, which compresses the radar return of the satellite along the Doppler axis.

Physical characteristics

Surface, albedo and composition 

The asteroid is covered with craters and is dark, red, and primitive.

Diameter 

With a diameter between 2.7 and 3.2 kilometers,  is one of largest known potentially hazardous asteroid (see PHA-list). Conversely, the Collaborative Asteroid Lightcurve Link assumes a standard albedo for stony asteroids of 0.20 and calculates a diameter of 1.08 kilometers based on an absolute magnitude of 17.2.

Gallery

Notes

References

External links 

 NASA Radar Reveals Asteroid Has Its Own Moon at NASA
 Animation of binary asteroid 1998 QE2 derived from radar data
 Arecibo Radar Sees Asteroid 1998 QE2 and Moon  (15 June 2013)
 Asteroid Lightcurve Database (LCDB), query form (info )
 Asteroids with Satellites, Robert Johnston, johnstonsarchive.net
 
 
 

285263
285263
285263
285263
285263
20130531
19980819